Lauro Bordin (7 July 1890 – 19 May 1963) was an Italian racing cyclist. He won the 1914 edition of the Giro di Lombardia.

References

External links
 

1890 births
1963 deaths
Italian male cyclists
Cyclists from the Province of Rovigo